Kmc and KMC may refer to:
KMC Chain Industrial, company producing bicycle chains
KMC Controls (originally Kreuter Manufacturing Company), a BAS/HVAC controls manufacturer
Kadapa Municipal Corporation
Kaisis Motor Company
Kaiserslautern Military Community
Kandy Municipal Council,  the local council for Kandy, Sri Lanka
Kapaun Mt. Carmel High School
Karachi Metropolitan Corporation
Kangaroo Mother Care
Kasturba Medical College, Mangalore
Kasturba Medical College, Manipal
KMC International Center, Manipal, India
Katihar Medical College, Katihar, India
Katuri Medical College
KMC (musician), a soca musician from Trinidad and Tobago
Korean marine corps
Keelung City Council
Khulna Medical College
Khyber Medical College
Kolkata Municipal Corporation
Kollam Municipal Corporation
Kia Motors Company
Kiira Motors Corporation, an Automotive Company in Uganda
Kinetic Monte Carlo
Kingston Maurward College
Kirori Mal College, in Delhi
Kilpauk Medical College, Chennai
 An act by Benny Benassi, an Italian DJ
Kuominchun, or in pinyin Guominjun, the military faction founded by Feng Yuxiang, Hu Jingyi and Sun Yue during China's Warlord Era
Kureha Micro Capsule Oil, diisopropylnaphthalene isomers used in inks